Zaranj (Persian/Pashto/) is a city in southwestern Afghanistan, which has a population of 160,902 people as of 2015. It is the capital of Nimruz Province and is linked by highways with Lashkargah and Kandahar to the east, Farah to the north and the Iranian city of Zabol to the west.

The Abresham border crossing is located to the west of Zaranj, on the Afghanistan–Iran border. It is one of three important trade-routes that connect Central Asia, East Asia and South Asia with the Middle East.

The history of Zaranj dates back over 2500 years and Ya'qub ibn al-Layth al-Saffar, founder of the Saffarid dynasty, was born in this old civilization.

History 

Modern Zaranj bears the name of an ancient city whose name is also attested in Old Persian as Zranka. In Greek, this word became Drangiana. Other historical names for Zaranj include Zirra, Zarangia, Zarani etc. Ultimately, the word Zaranj is derived from the ancient Old Persian word zaranka ("waterland").

Achaemenid Zranka, the capital of Drangiana, was almost certainly located at Dahan-e Gholaman, southeast of Zabol in Iran. After the abandonment of that city, its name, Zarang or Zaranj in later Perso-Arabic orthography, was transferred to the subsequent administrative centers of the region, which itself came to be known as Sakastān, then Sijistan and finally Sistān. Medieval Zaranj is located at Nād-i `Alī, 4.4 km north of the modern city of Zaranj. According to the Arab geographers, prior to medieval Zaranj, the capital of Sistan was located at Ram Shahristan (Abar shariyar). Ram Shahristan had been supplied with water by a canal from the Helmand River, but its dam broke, the area was deprived of water, and the populace moved three days' march to found Zaranj. This Zaranj appears on the Peutinger Map of late Antiquity.

The area came under Muslim rule in 652, when Zaranj surrendered to the governor of Khurāsān; it subsequently became a base for further caliphal expansion in the region. In 661, a small Arab garrison reestablished its authority in the region after having temporarily lost control due to skirmishes and revolts. A Nestorian Christian community is recorded in Zaranj in the sixth century, and by the end of the eighth century there was a Jacobite diocese of Zaranj. In the 9th century Zaranj was the capital of the Saffarid dynasty, whose founder was the local coppersmith turned warlord, Ya'qub ibn al-Layth al-Saffar. It became part of the Ghaznavids, Ghorids, Trimurids, Safavids and others. Defeated by the Samanids in 900, the Saffarids sank to a position of regional importance, until conquered by Mahmud of Ghazni in 1003. Subsequently, Zaranj served as the capital of the Nasrid (1029–1225) and Mihrabānid (1236–1537) maliks of Nīmrūz.

In the early 18th century, the city became part of the Afghan Hotaki dynasty until they were removed from power in 1738 by Nader Shah of Khorasan. By 1747, Ahmad Shah Durrani made it part of modern Afghanistan after he united all the different tribes and acquired the territories from northeastern Iran to Delhi in India. Under the modern Afghan governments, the area was known as Farah-Chakansur Province until 1968, when it was separated to form the provinces of Nimruz and Farah. The city of Zaranj became the capital of Nimroz province.

Early 21st century 

A new highway called Route 606 was built between Zaranj and Delaram in Farah province by the Indian Government's Border Roads Organization at a cost of about US$136 million to open up a link between the deep sea port at Chabahar in Iran to Afghanistan's main ring road highway system which connects Kabul, Kandahar, Herat, Mazar-i-Sharif and Kunduz. The  highway, a symbol of India's developmental work in the war-ravaged country, was handed over to Afghan authorities by Indian External Affairs Minister Pranab Mukherjee in January 2009 in the presence of Afghan President Hamid Karzai and Foreign Minister Rangeen Dadfar Spanta. "Completion of the road reflects the determination of both India and Afghanistan that nothing can prevent or hinder collaboration between the two countries," Mukherjee said at a function to mark this handover. On the occasion, Karzai said, the completion of the project is a message to those who want to stop cooperation between India and Afghanistan. "Our cooperation will not stop". The Taliban was opposed to this project and launched frequent attacks on the construction workers in an attempt to force the winding up of the work. A total of six Indians, including a Border Roads Organisation driver and four ITBP soldiers, and 129 Afghans were killed in these attacks.

The province has been one of the 7 (Nimruz, Helmand, Kandahar, Uruzgan, Ghazni, Paktika and Zabul) where the Taliban have been recently regrouping. On 14 August 2012 dozens of civilians were killed in Zaranj by several suicide-bombers in a major terrorist attack on the city.

Due to Zaranj's close proximity to Iran, the city relies mostly on Iranian products. With the increase of trade the Afghan Border Police is dealing with a rise in smuggling, particularly illegal drugs and weapons. The overall economic situation is becoming better for the local population of the city. Hundreds of trucks containing merchandise from the Middle East enter the city on a daily basis.

In the last decade, the U.S. Marines and others of the International Security Assistance Force (ISAF) have been visiting Zaranj city. The US Marines and other U.S. officials are involved with the Afghan government in major development projects. This includes improvement made to the irrigation network of the city, building of Afghan military and Afghan National Police barracks as well as a hospital and a school.

The city is served by Zaranj Airport, which is also being improved by the United States. US Marines assigned to 3rd Marine Aircraft Wing have been visiting Zaranj since US Marine Base Forward Operating Base Delaram was built in Delaram district of Zaranj. The 3rd Marine Aircraft Wing built two concrete helicopter landing zones on western side of the gravel runway of Zaranj Airport to ease the landing of USMC V-22 Osprey helicopters from 3rd Battalion 4th Marines. The helipads now serve all helicopters landing at Zaranj airport.

Taliban capture 

On 6 August 2021, it was confirmed by local sources that the city had been captured by the Taliban, making it the first provincial capital captured by the Taliban during their advances after the withdrawal of foreign forces in Afghanistan. Afghan officials stated the Taliban faced "little resistance" in capturing the city with the 215th Corps of the Afghan National Army focusing instead on the Battle of Lashkargah. Shortly after entering the city, the Taliban broke into the city's prison, releasing a large number of prisoners into Zaranj.

On March 8, 2022, the New York Times reported a boom in the business of smugglers helping - for payment - the escape of hundreds of thousands of Afghans seeking to cross into Iran, to escape the Taliban rule and/or the harsh economic conditions. According to the report, "nearly everyone in Zaranj is involved, in one way or another, in the smuggling business". As described in the paper, "Zaranj is lively. Newcomers buy kebabs from street vendors, peruse shops and sit around plastic tables, eager to learn more about the grueling journey ahead".

Climate 
Zaranj has a hot desert climate (Köppen climate classification BWh) with very hot summers and cool winters. Precipitation is very low, and mostly falls in winter. Temperatures in summer may approach .

Demographics 

According to the Ministry of Rural Rehabilitation and Development (MRRD) along with UNHCR and Central Statistics Office (CSO) of Afghanistan, the population of Zaranj was around 49,851 in 2004. The ethnic groups are as follows: Baloch 44%, Pashtun 34% and Tajik 22%.

The city of Zaranj has a population of 160,902 people.

There are 17,878 residential dwellings in Zarat and 1,759 hectares of agricultural land. Commercial land use is clustered on the main road to Iran.

Notable people 
Ya'qub ibn al-Layth al-Saffar founder of the Saffarid dynasty of Sistan, born in Karnin near Zaranj
Amr ibn al-Layth second ruler of the Saffarid dynasty, born in Karnin near Zaranj
Al-Layth ibn Ali ibn al-Layth, amir of the Saffarid amirate in Zaranj from 909 until 910
Al-Mu'addal ibn al-Layth, Saffarid ruler of Zaranj for a part of 911

Route 606: Delaram-Zaranj Highway

The Delaram–Zaranj Highway, also known as Route 606, is a 217-km or 135-mile-long two-lane road built by India in Afghanistan, connecting Delaram in Farah Province with Zaranj in neighbouring Nimruz Province near the Iranian border. It connects the Afghan–Iranian border with the Kandahar–Herat Highway in Delaram, which provides connectivity to other major Afghan cities via A01, including to India's planned mining operation in Hajigak mining concession. Route 606 reduces travel time between Delaram and Zaranj from the earlier 12–14 hours to just 2 hours. India-Iran signed an agreement in May 2016 to connect it to Port of Chabahar with rail and road links.

See also 
List of cities in Afghanistan
Islam Qala
Drangiana

References

Bibliography
Bosworth, C. E., "Sistān ii. In the Islamic period," in Encyclopaedia Iranica (2011).
Gnoli, G., "Dahan-e Ḡolāmān," in Encyclopaedia Iranica, vol. 6 (1993), 582–585.

Schmitt, R., "Drangiana," in Encyclopaedia Iranica, vol. 7 (1995) 534–537.

External links
 
  (May 10, 2022)
Zaranj shows promise for future of Nimroz province 

Nimruz Province
Populated places in Nimruz Province
Afghanistan–Iran border crossings
Saffarid dynasty
Sistan
Provincial capitals in Afghanistan